West Ridge is an unincorporated community in Mississippi County, Arkansas, United States. West Ridge has a post office with ZIP code 72391.

References

Unincorporated communities in Mississippi County, Arkansas
Unincorporated communities in Arkansas